Huachuca City is a town in Cochise County, Arizona, United States. As of the 2010 census, the population was 1,853.

Fort Huachuca, a U.S. Army base, is located just south of the municipality.

History

Huachuca City started out as a stop along the Southern Pacific Railroad. The rail stretched between Tombstone and Patagonia and is no longer in operation today. With the re-opening of Fort Huachuca in 1954, the area began to grow and the community  went through several name changes: Campstone Station, Sunset City, and Huachuca Vista, before finally settling on the name Huachuca City. It  incorporated in 1958.

Today, Huachuca City is a small town located at the north exit of Fort Huachuca, the major employment for the town. With retirees moving in and tourism a major business because of the proximity to Tombstone and Kartchner Caverns State Park, Huachuca City is a growing area.

Geography
Huachuca City is located in southwestern Cochise County. The city of Sierra Vista and Fort Huachuca lie along the town's southern border.

Climate
According to the Köppen Climate Classification system, Huachuca City has a semi-arid climate, abbreviated "BSk" on climate maps.

Transportation

Huachuca City Transit, operated by the city, runs between Huachuca City and Sierra Vista.

Demographics

As of the census of 2000, there were 1,751 people, 713 households, and 432 families residing in the town. The racial makeup of the town was 75.4% White, 6.8% Black or African American, 2.7% Native American, 1.5% Asian, 0.2% Pacific Islander, 8.2% from other races, and 5.3% from two or more races. 16.3% of the population were Hispanic or Latino of any race.

There were 713 households, out of which 31.3% had children under the age of 18 living with them, 44.3% were married couples living together, 12.3% had a female householder with no husband present, and 39.3% were non-families. 32.8% of all households were made up of individuals, and 11.5% had someone living alone who was 65 years of age or older. The average household size was 2.43 and the average family size was 3.13.

In the town, the age distribution of the population shows 28.4% under the age of 18, 8.8% from 18 to 24, 25.5% from 25 to 44, 24.6% from 45 to 64, and 12.7% who were 65 years of age or older. The median age was 37 years. For every 100 females, there were 93.1 males. For every 100 females age 18 and over, there were 89.4 males.

The median income for a household in the town was $26,311, and the median income for a family was $33,938. Males had a median income of $26,685 versus $20,179 for females. The per capita income for the town was $14,378. About 13.8% of families and 19.3% of the population were below the poverty line, including 24.6% of those under age 18 and 14.7% of those age 65 or over.

References

External links

 Town of Huachuca City official website

Towns in Cochise County, Arizona
Populated places established in 1958
Arizona placenames of Native American origin
1958 establishments in Arizona